Leonard Milner (15 September 1917 – 25 June 1944), known as Les Milner, was an English professional footballer who played as an inside forward in the Football League for York City.

Personal life
Milner was married. He served as a sergeant in the Seaforth Highlanders during the Second World War and was killed near Bayeux in the Battle of Normandy on 25 June 1944. He is buried at Ryes War Cemetery, Bazenville.

Career statistics

References

1917 births
1944 deaths
Footballers from York
Association football inside forwards
English footballers
English Football League players
York Railway Institute A.F.C. players
Hull City A.F.C. players
York City F.C. players
Seaforth Highlanders soldiers
British Army personnel killed in World War II
Burials at Ryes War Cemetery
Military personnel from York